Riana Nel (9 November 1982) is a Namibian singer and songwriter. After growing up in Windhoek she moved to Pretoria, South Africa, to start her career.

Professional career 
Her songs have been described as including elements of "pop & country". She is known for the singer who can make up a song with just a few words on the spot. She had firmly placed her roots in gospel music on release of the albums Oopmond, The Cure, Breathe and Someone with Skin and has won several awards including the Crescendo Award in 2000, a SAMA, Huisgenoot tempo's and Ghoema awards. The album Die Moeite Werd appealed more to the secular market and has reached platinum status and continues to top South African music charts. Nel has also starred in the Afrikaans movie, 'n Saak van Geloof alongside her co-star Robbie Wessels, the well acclaimed South African singer-songwriter/comedian.

Nel is a well acclaimed songwriter having written songs for Juanita Du Plessis, Bobby Van Jaarsveld, Lianie May, Touch of Class and world-renowned Amira Willighagen. Nel has shared a stage with her sister Nianell, Bobby van Jaarsveld, Lianie May, Lira and many more. She recorded duets with André Swiegers (Blou), Bobby van Jaarsveld (Die Liefde kom net eens in 'n Leeftyd), Die Heuwels Fantasties (Doen net wat ons wil), Retief Burger (U's my God) and Steve Hofmeyr (Skree).

She has performed in South Africa, Namibia, France, the Netherlands, the UK, Nashville in the U.S., Russia, Mozambique and Australia.

Nel was a coach on The Voice South Africa 2019.

Personal life 
Nel's sister, Nianell, is also a singer and songwriter.

Discography

Studio albums

References 

1982 births
Afrikaans-language singers
Living people
Musicians from Windhoek
Namibian emigrants to South Africa
21st-century Namibian women singers
Namibian artists